Blasting may refer to:

 Abrasive blasting
 Blast furnace
 Rock blasting

See also 
 Blast (disambiguation)
 Blaster (disambiguation)